The Waterbird Society, formerly known as the Colonial Waterbirds Society, is a United States based ornithological society, focusing on the behavior, ecology, and conservation of waterbirds.  It was founded in 1976 as the Colonial Waterbird Group, becoming the Colonial Waterbird Society in 1986 and acquiring its current name in 1999 to reflect an expanding interest in all waterbirds. It makes two international awards, the Robert Cushman Murphy Prize for excellence in avian sciences, and the Kai Curry-Lindahl Prize for excellence in conservation biology.  The Waterbird Society is a member of the Ornithological Council.

Journal 
The society has published the journal Waterbirds, with the subtitle The International Journal of Waterbird Biology under its current namesake since 1999. Before that, the journal was called the Proceedings of the Colonial Waterbird Group from 1978 to 1980, and then, from 1981 to 1998, the journal was known as Colonial Waterbirds.

References

Ornithological organizations in the United States
1976 establishments in the United States

External Links 
Waterbird Society Official Site